Minister of Religious Affairs is Minister in charge of the Ministry of Religious Affairs, Government of Bangladesh. He is also the Minister of all departments and agencies under the Ministry of Religious Affairs. Prior to 1980, religion-related matters were looked after first under the Ministry of Education and later under the Ministry of Sports, Culture and Religion. It started its journey on January 25, 1980 through separate ministries and ministers. Here are the names of all the ministers, advisors, state ministers and deputy ministers.

List of office holders

See also 

 Cabinet of Bangladesh

References 

Ministry of Religious Affairs (Bangladesh)
Religion in Bangladesh
Government ministers of Bangladesh
Lists of ministers by ministry of Bangladesh